Carlos Sampayan Bulosan (November 24, 1913 – September 11, 1956) was an English-language Filipino novelist and poet who immigrated to America on July 1, 1930. He never returned to the Philippines and he spent most of his life in the United States. His best-known work today is the semi-autobiographical America Is in the Heart, but he first gained fame for his 1943 essay on The Freedom from Want.

Early life and immigration
Bulosan was born to Ilocano parents in the Philippines in Binalonan, Pangasinan. There is considerable debate around his actual birth date, as he himself used several dates. 1911 is generally considered to be the most reliable answer, based on his baptismal records, but according to the late Lorenzo Duyanen Sampayan, his childhood playmate and nephew, Carlos was born on November 2, 1913. Most of his youth was spent in the countryside as a farmer. It is during his youth that he and his family were economically impoverished by the rich and political elite, which would become one of the main themes of his writing. His home town is also the starting point of his semi-autobiographical novel, America is in the Heart.

Following the pattern of many Filipinos during the American colonial period, he left for America on July 22, 1930, at age 17, in the hope of finding salvation from the economic depression of his home. He never again saw his Philippine homeland. Upon arriving in Seattle, he was met with racism and was forced to work low paying jobs.  He worked as a farmworker, harvesting grapes and asparagus, while also working other forms of hard labor in the fields of California.  He also worked as a dishwasher with his brother Lorenzo in the famous Madonna Inn in San Luis Obispo which opened in 1958 or almost three years after Bulosan had died.

In 1936, Bulosan suffered from tuberculosis and was taken to the Los Angeles County hospital. There, he underwent three operations and stayed two years, mostly in the convalescent ward. During his long stay in the hospital, Bulosan spent his time constantly reading and writing.

Labor movement work
Bulosan was active in labour movement along the Pacific coast of the United States and edited the 1952 Yearbook for International Longshore and Warehouse Union Local 37, a predominantly Filipino American cannery trade union based in Seattle.

Writing
There is some controversy surrounding the accuracy of events recorded within America Is in the Heart.  He is celebrated for giving a post-colonial, Asian immigrant perspective to the labor movement in America and for telling the experience of Filipinos working in the U.S. during the 1930s and '40s.  In the 1970s, with a resurgence in Asian/Pacific Islander American activism, his unpublished writings were discovered in a library in the University of Washington leading to posthumous releases of several unfinished works and anthologies of his poetry.

His other novels include The Laughter of My Father, which were originally published as short sketches, and the posthumously published The Cry and the Dedication which detailed the Hukbalahap Rebellion in the Philippines.

One of his most famous essays, published in March 1943, was chosen by The Saturday Evening Post to accompany its publication of the Norman Rockwell painting Freedom from Want, part of a series based on Franklin D. Roosevelt's "Four Freedoms" speech. Maxim Lieber was his literary agent in 1944.

Death and legacy

As a labor organizer and socialist writer, he was blacklisted during the Second Red Scare of the 1950s. Denied a means to provide for himself, his later years were of illness, hardship, and alcoholism. He died in Seattle suffering from malnutrition and an advanced stage of bronchopneumonia.  He is buried at Mount Pleasant Cemetery on Queen Anne Hill in Seattle.

Upon his death, union leader Chris Mensalvas, wrote the following obituary: "Carlos Bulosan, 30 years old (sic), died 11 September1956, Seattle. Birthplace: Philippines, Address: Unknown; Occupation: Writer; Hobby: Famous for his jungle salad served during Foreign-Born Committee dinners. Estate: One typewriter, a twenty-year old suit, unfinished manuscripts, worn out sock; Finances: Zero. Beneficiary: His people."

His works did not immediately garner widespread appreciation. For two decades after his death, his work was largely forgotten, until a group of young Asian Americans rediscovered his works and led to the republication of America is in the Heart in 1973.

Bulosan's works and legacy is heralded in a permanent exhibition, "The Carlos Bulosan Memorial Exhibit," at the Eastern Hotel in Seattle's International District. Its centerpiece mural is titled "Secrets of History" and was created by Eliseo Art Silva.

In 2018, the Bulosan Center for Filipino Studies Initiative was established at the University of California, Davis to carry on his legacy of activism through research and advocacy of the Filipino and Filipino-American community. The initiative backs the creation of a physical Bulosan Center for Filipino Studies to support research, education and advocacy. The center aims to continue Bulosan's legacy by uplifting the voices of the most marginalized in the Filipino community in the United States and the diaspora through community-engaged research and broadly disseminating knowledge about Filipinos for the purpose of advancing their rights and welfare.

Works
Letter from America (The Press of James A. Decker, 1942) 
America Is in the Heart  (1946)
The Laughter of My Father (1944)
The Cry and the Dedication (1995)
My Father's Tragedy 
The Romance of Magno Rubio
If You Want To Know What We Are
My Father goes to Court

References

Sources
"Bulosan's Laughter: The Making of Carlos Bulosan" *Bulosan Exhibit
Hounded to Death: the FBI File of Filipino Author Carlos Bulosan
Carlos Bulosan Theatre
"Filipino American Hip-Hop: Renewing the Spirit of Carlos Bulosan"
See 2014 Edition (Univ. of Washington Press) of his "America Is In the Heart" as its two Introductions,'For Further Reading' and 'Works Cited' are quite extensive.

Further reading
Carlos Bulosan Papers, 1914-1976. 4.65 cubic feet, 17 microfilm reels. At the Labor Archives of Washington, University of Washington Libraries Special Collections.
Aurelio Bulosan Papers. 1949–1974. .18 cubic feet (1 box). Contains records by Aurelio Bulosan regarding his brother, Carlos Bulosan. At the Labor Archives of Washington, University of Washington Libraries Special Collections.
Mary Gibson Papers. 1903–1964. 1 box and 1 vertical file including 2 sound cassettes. Contains a photograph of Carlos Bulosan. At the Labor Archives of Washington, University of Washington Libraries Special Collections.
 Seiwoong Oh: Encyclopedia of Asian-American Literature. Series: Encyclopedia of American Ethnic Literature. Facts on File, 2007

External links
HistoryLink.org- the Free Online Encyclopedia of Washington State History

1913 births
1956 deaths
Writers from Pangasinan
American writers of Filipino descent
Filipino emigrants to the United States
Ilocano people
Deaths from pneumonia in Washington (state)
Deaths from bronchopneumonia
American novelists of Asian descent
American short story writers of Asian descent
American autobiographers
20th-century American novelists
American male novelists
American male short story writers
20th-century American short story writers
Filipino male short story writers
Filipino short story writers
20th-century American male writers
American people of Ilocano descent
20th-century American non-fiction writers
American male non-fiction writers